Justice Haymond may refer to:

Alpheus F. Haymond, associate justice of the Supreme Court of Appeals of West Virginia
Frank Cruise Haymond, associate justice of the Supreme Court of Appeals of West Virginia

See also
Justice Hammond (disambiguation)